The Basilica of Saint Mary of the Altar in Heaven is a titular basilica in Rome, located on the highest summit of the Campidoglio. It is still the designated church of the city council of Rome, which uses the ancient title of Senatus Populusque Romanus. The present cardinal priest of the Titulus Sanctae Mariae de Aracoeli is Salvatore De Giorgi.

The shrine is known for housing relics belonging to Helena, mother of Emperor Constantine, various minor relics from the Holy Sepulchre, both the pontifically crowned images of Nostra Signora di Mano di Oro di Aracoeli (1636) on the high altar and the Santo Bambino of Aracoeli (1897).

History 

Originally the church was named Sancta Maria in Capitolio, since it was sited on the Capitoline Hill (Campidoglio, in Italian) of Ancient Rome; by the 14th century it had been renamed. A medieval legend included in the mid-12th-century guide to Rome, Mirabilia Urbis Romae, claimed that the church was built over an Augustan Ara primogeniti Dei, in the place where the Tiburtine Sibyl prophesied to Augustus the coming of the Christ. "For this reason the figures of Augustus and of the Tiburtine sibyl are painted on either side of the arch above the high altar" (Lanciani chapter 1). A later legend substituted an apparition of the Virgin Mary.

In The History of Money, anthropologist Jack Weatherford goes into some detail about the church's previous incarnation as the temple of Juno Moneta—on the Arx—after whom Money is named.

According to Roman historians, in the fourth century B.C., the irritated honking of the sacred geese around Juno's temple on Capitoline Hill warned the people of an impending night attack by the Gauls, who were secretly scaling the walls of the citadel. From this event, the goddess acquired [the] surname-Juno Moneta, from Latin monere (to warn) . . . As patroness of the state, Juno Moneta presided over various activities of the state, including the primary activity of issuing money.

. . . from Moneta came the modem English words mint and money and, ultimately, from the Latin word meaning warning.

Today, the site of the Temple of Juno Moneta, the source of the great stream of Roman currency, has given way to the ancient . . . brick church of Santa Maria in Aracoeli. Centuries ago, church architects incorporated the ruins of the ancient temple into the new building.

The church is also thought to have replaced the auguraculum, the seat of the augurs.

The foundation of the church was laid on the site of a Byzantine abbey mentioned in 574. Many buildings were built around the first church; in the upper part they gave rise to a cloister, while on the slopes of the hill a little quarter and a market grew up. Remains of these buildings - such as the little church of San Biagio de Mercato and the underlying "Insula Romana") - were discovered in the 1930s.
At first the church followed the Greek rite, a sign of the power of the Byzantine exarch. Taken over by the papacy by the 9th century, the church was given first to the Benedictines, then, by papal bull to the Franciscans in 1249–1250; under the Franciscans it received its Romanesque-Gothic aspect. The arches that divide the nave from the aisles are supported on columns, no two precisely alike, scavenged from Roman ruins.
 

During the Middle Ages, this church became the centre of the religious and civil life of the city. in particular during the republican experience of the 14th century, when self-proclaimed Tribune and reviver of the Roman Republic Cola di Rienzo inaugurated the monumental stairway of 124 steps in front of the church, designed in 1348 by Simone Andreozzi, on the occasion of the Black Death. Condemned criminals were executed at the foot of the steps; there Cola di Rienzo met his death, near the spot where his statue commemorates him.

In 1571, Santa Maria in Aracoeli hosted the celebrations honoring Marcantonio Colonna after the victorious Battle of Lepanto over the Turkish fleet. Marking this occasion, the compartmented ceiling was gilded and painted (finished 1575), to thank the Blessed Virgin for the victory. In 1797, with the Roman Republic, the basilica was deconsecrated and turned into a stable.

Exterior 

The original unfinished façade lost the mosaics and subsequent frescoes that originally decorated it, save a mosaic in the tympanum of the main door, one of three doors that were later additions. The gothic window is the primary detail that tourists observe from the bottom of the stairs; it is the only authentically Gothic detail of the basilica.

Interior 
The basilica is built as a nave and two aisles that are divided by Roman columns, which were taken from diverse antique monuments and are all different. Among its numerous treasures are Pinturicchio's 15th-century frescoes depicting the life of Saint Bernardino of Siena in the Bufalini Chapel, the first chapel on the right. Other features are the wooden ceiling, the inlaid cosmatesque floor, a Transfiguration  painted on wood by Girolamo Siciolante da Sermoneta, and works by other  artists like Pietro Cavallini (of his frescoes only one survives), Benozzo Gozzoli, and Giulio Romano.
 

It also houses the Madonna Aracoeli (Our Lady of the Golden Hands), a Byzantine icon of the 10-11th century, in the altar. This Marian image was Pontifically crowned  on 29 March 1636 by Pope Urban VIII. Pope Pius XII consecrated the people of Rome to the Most Blessed Virgin Mary and her Immaculate Heart in front of this image on 30 May 1948. In the transept there is a sepulchral monument by Arnolfo di Cambio.

The church was also famous in Rome for the wooden statue of the Santo Bambino of Aracoeli, carved in the 15th century of olive wood from the Garden of Gethsemane in modern Israel and covered with valuable ex-votos. Many Romans believed in the spiritual efficacy of devotion to this statue. The French took the statue in 1797, it was then recovered, and then stolen again in February 1994. A copy was made from wood from Gethsemane, which copy is presently displayed in its own chapel near the sacristy. At midnight Mass on Christmas Eve the image is brought out to a throne before the high altar and unveiled at the Gloria. Until Epiphany the bejeweled image resides in the Nativity crib in the left nave of the basilica.

The relics of Helena, mother of Constantine the Great, are housed in the basilica, as is the tablet with the monogram of Jesus that Bernardino of Siena used to promote devotion to the Holy Name of Jesus.

Burials 

 Catherine of Bosnia, Bosnian Queen
 Pope Honorius IV, son of Luca Savelli
 Brother Juniper, one of the original followers of Saint Francis of Assisi
 Giulio Salvadori, the poet
 Luca Savelli, right transept, left side
 Giovanna Aldobransdeschi dei Conti di Santa Fiora, wife of Luca Savelli, right transept, right side
 Cardinal Matteo d'Acquasparta
 Carlo Crivelli, Archdeacon of Acquilea, sculpted by Donatello
 Cardinal Louis d'Albret (Lodovico Lebretto)
 Fillipo Della Valle, fifth chapel on left
 Cardinal Giovanni Battista Savelli
 Cardinal Pietro di Vicenti, passage to side door

Curiosities 

 The church also contains the marble tomb of Cecchino Bracci, pupil of artist Michelangelo who had dedicated a number of poems in his name. The tomb's design (not the carving) is by Michelangelo. 
 A part of the last mission of the game Assassin's Creed: Brotherhood takes place in this basilica, which the Assassins discover has been built on top of an ancient Isu temple.
 In this church, football player Francesco Totti and Ilary Blasi celebrated their marriage in 2005, followed by thousands of fans.
 It was this church where Edward Gibbon was struck with the idea to write his Decline and Fall of the Roman Empire.  "It was at Rome, on the 15th of October 1764," he wrote in his "Autobiography", "as I sat musing amid the ruins of the capitol, while the bare-footed friars were singing vespers in the temple of Jupiter [Gibbon was mistaken; this church was actually the former Temple of Juno Moneta], that the idea of writing the decline and fall of the city first started to my mind.”

See also 

 Churches of Rome

References

Bibliography 
 Johanna Elfriede Louise Heideman, The cinquecento chapel decorations in S. Maria in Aracoeli in Rome, Academische Pers, 1982.

External links
 Riccardo Cigola, "Basilica di Santa Maria in Aracoeli"
 Rodolfo Lanciani, Pagan and Christian Rome, ch 1 "The Transformation of Rome from a Pagan to a Christian City"

6th-century establishments in Italy
Basilica churches in Rome
Titular churches
6th-century churches
Burial places of popes
Churches of Rome (rione Campitelli)
Capitoline Hill
Helena, mother of Constantine I